Bourg-en-Bresse is a railway station located in Bourg-en-Bresse, Ain, eastern France. The station was opened in 1855 and is located on the Ligne du Haut-Bugey, Mouchard–Bourg-en-Bresse railway, Lyon-Bourg-en-Bresse railway and Mâcon-Ambérieu railway. The train services are operated by SNCF.

Train services
The station is served by the following service(s):

High speed services (TGV) Paris - Bellegarde - Geneva
High speed services (TGV) Paris - Bellegarde - Annemasse - Evian-les-Bains
High speed services (TGV) Paris - Aix-les-Bains - Annecy
Regional services (TER Bourgogne-Franche-Comté) Besançon - Mouchard - Lons-le-Saunier - Bourg-en-Bresse - Lyon
Regional services (TER Bourgogne-Franche-Comté) Dijon - St-Jean-de-Losne - Seurre - Louhans - Bourg-en-Bresse
Local services (TER Auvergne-Rhône-Alpes) Bourg-en-Bresse - Oyonnax - Saint-Claude
Local services (TER Auvergne-Rhône-Alpes) Ambérieu - Bourg-en-Bresse - Mâcon

References

Railway stations in Ain
Railway stations in France opened in 1856